Alberto Álvaro Ríos (born September 18, 1952) is a US academic and writer who is the author of ten books and chapbooks of poetry, three collections of short stories, and a memoir.

Rios was named Arizona's first state poet laureate in August 2013, a position he continues to hold.

Life
Alberto Ríos graduated from University of Arizona with an MFA. He is a Regents' Professor at Arizona State University, where he has taught since 1982 and where he holds the further distinction of the Katharine C. Turner Endowed Chair in English.

His book A Small Story About the Sky was published in 2015 by Copper Canyon Press. Other books of poems include The Dangerous Shirt, along with The Theater of Night, winner of the 2007 PEN/Beyond Margins Award, The Smallest Muscle in the Human Body, finalist for the National Book Award, Teodoro Luna's Two Kisses, The Lime Orchard Woman, The Warrington Poems, Five Indiscretions, and Whispering to Fool the Wind, which won the Walt Whitman Award.

His three collections of short stories are The Curtain of Trees, Pig Cookies and The Iguana Killer, which won the first Western States Book Award for Fiction, judged by Robert Penn Warren.

His memoir about growing up on the Mexico-Arizona border, called Capirotada, won the Latino Literary Hall of Fame Award and was designated the OneBookArizona choice for 2009.

Ríos is the recipient of the Western Literature Association Distinguished Achievement Award, the Arizona Governor's Arts Award, fellowships from the Guggenheim Foundation and the National Endowment for the Arts, the Walt Whitman Award, the Western States Book Award for Fiction, six Pushcart Prizes in both poetry and fiction, and inclusion in The Norton Anthology of Modern Poetry.

In 2014, he was elected a Chancellor of the Academy of American Poets.

Ríos is also a host for ASU's Walter Cronkite School of Journalism and Mass Communication's KAET. He hosted the litereray interview show Books & Co. from 2009 to 2018. He currently hosts the arts interview show Art in the 48.

Bibliography

Poetry
His books of poems include:
 A Small Story About the Sky, Copper Canyon Press, 2015, 
 
 The Theater of Night, Copper Canyon Press, 2006, 
  nominated for the National Book Award,
 Teodoro Luna's Two Kisses W. W. Norton, Incorporated, 1992, 
 The Lime Orchard Woman Sheep Meadow Press, 1988, 
 The Warrington Poems, Pyracantha Press, Arizona State University, School of Art, 1989
 Five Indiscretions The Sheep Meadow Press, 1985, 
 Whispering to Fool the Wind, Sheep Meadow Press, 1982, 
 Sleeping on Fists (Dooryard Press, 1981)
 Elk Heads on the Wall(Mango Publications, 1979)
 Spring in the Only Place Spring Was

Short story collections
 The Curtain of Trees
 Pig Cookies
 
 The Secret Lion

Non-fiction
 Capirotada, University of New México Press, 1999, a memoir about growing up on the Mexican border

Honors

 Guggenheim Foundation fellowship
 National Endowment for the Arts fellowship
 Walt Whitman Award
 Outstanding Latino/a Cultural Award in Literary Arts or Publications, American Association of Hispanics in Higher Education (AAHHE), 2004
 Western States Book Award for fiction
 Pushcart Prize - awarded 6 times for both poetry and fiction
 2005 Historymaker selection by the Arizona History Society's Museum, a Smithsonian affiliate, at Papago Park, Tempe, Arizona
 2007 recipient of the PEN/Beyond Margins Award for The Theater of Night

Notes

References
 Wild, Peter (1998). Alberto Ríos. Boise, Idaho: Boise State University "Western Writers Series" #131. pp. 51.

External links
 Alberto Álvaro Ríos faculty/personal website – Arizona State University

1952 births
Living people
Arizona State University faculty
American male poets
American short story writers
American memoirists
University of Arizona alumni
People from Nogales, Arizona
People from Chandler, Arizona
Poets Laureate of Arizona
Poets from Arizona
American male short story writers
American male non-fiction writers